Mia, Mía, MIA, or M.I.A. may refer to:

Music

Artists
 M.I.A. (rapper) (born 1975), English rapper and singer
 M.I.A. (band), 1980s punk rock band from Orange County, California
 MIA., a German rock/pop band formed in 1997
 Mia (singer) (born 1983), Lithuanian singer and television presenter

Songs
 "Mía" (Armando Manzanero song)
 "Mia" (Bad Bunny song) (2018)
 "Mía" (Paulina Rubio song)
 "Mía" (Tito El Bambino song)
"M.I.A" (Cher Lloyd song) (2019)
 "Mia", a song by Aerosmith from Night in the Ruts
 "M.I.A.", a song by Avenged Sevenfold from City of Evil
 "Mia", a 1967 song by Sergio Bruni
 "Mia", a song by Chevelle from Point No. 1
 "Mia", a song by Emmy the Great from First Love 
 "M.I.A.", a song by the Foo Fighters from There Is Nothing Left to Lose
 "Mia", a 1992 song by Gorki from Gorky
 "Le Mia", a song by IAM
 "Mia", a song by IU
 "M.I.A.", a song by M.I.A. from Arular
 "MIA", a 2013 song by Travis Scott from Owl Pharaoh
 "M.I.A.", a song by 7 Year Bitch from ¡Viva Zapata!
 "M.I.A", a 2018 song by Stray Kids from I Am Who
 "M.I.A", a 2021 song by Sumo Cyco from Initiation
 "Mia", a 2021 song by Snail Mail from Valentine

Organizations
 Malaysian Institute of Accountants
 Marxists Internet Archive
 Michigan Islamic Academy, Ann Arbor, US
 Minneapolis Institute of Art, Minnesota, US
 Montgomery Improvement Association, Alabama, US
 Ministry of Internal Affairs (Russia)
 Mutual Improvement Association (disambiguation), various bodies

People

Transportation
 Mia Station, a subway station in Seoul, South Korea
 Miami International Airport's IATA code
 Manchester Airport station's station code

Other uses
 Mia (game), a dice game
 MIA (gene), which encodes melanoma-derived growth regulatory protein
 Music Industry Awards, a Belgian music industry award
 Mia electric, former French carmaker
 Mia-dong, a neighbourhood (dong) in Seoul, South Korea
 Magnetic immunoassay, a biochemical test
 Master of International Affairs, a degree
 Media Information Agency of the Republic of Macedonia
 Medically indigent adult, US person without healthcare
 Misfits in Action, a wrestling stable
 Missing in action, a casualty classification
 Murrumbidgee Irrigation Area, New South Wales, Australia
 Multilateral Agreement on Investment, an agreement between members of the OECD

See also
 Mía Novoa, a character in 
 Mia Mouse, a character in Mia's Big Adventure Collection
 Mornington Island Art, or MIArt, an Indigenous Australian art centre